Tomasz Busse (born 4 October 1956 in Łódź) is a Polish former wrestler who competed in the 1980 Summer Olympics.

References

1956 births
Living people
Olympic wrestlers of Poland
Wrestlers at the 1980 Summer Olympics
Polish male sport wrestlers
Sportspeople from Łódź